The SV&E Subdivision is a railroad line owned by CSX Transportation in the U.S. State of Kentucky. It was originally the Sandy Valley & Eastern Railroad, a line acquired by the Chesapeake and Ohio Railway, which eventually became part of CSX. At its north end the line branches off of the Big Sandy Subdivision and at its south end the line comes to an end.

See also
 List of CSX Transportation lines

References

CSX Transportation lines
Rail infrastructure in Kentucky
Chesapeake and Ohio Railway
Transportation in Pike County, Kentucky